Acervularia pentagona is an extinct species of tabulate coral. It is described as the smallest Acervularia species known, and most closely resembles A. coronata.

References

Tabulata
Prehistoric cnidarians